Lifson is a surname. Notable people with the surname include:

 Edward Lifson, American journalist, architecture critic, and academic
 Shneior Lifson (1914–2001), Israeli chemical physicist

See also
Lifson–Roig model